Bingöl is a city in Turkey. It is the seat of Bingöl Province and Bingöl District. Its population is 128,935 (2021).

Etymology
One of the historical names for the city, Bingöl literally means thousand lakes in Turkish; however, there aren't any lakes of considerable size within the boundaries of the province. The name rather refers to many tarns found around the city.

History
Bingöl is located in what was historically the region of Sophene (first an independent kingdom and later an Armenian and Roman province). The settlement is mentioned by its Armenian name, Chapaghjur (meaning "spread out water" in Armenian), by the 11th-century Armenian historian Stepanos Asoghik, who mentions it while describing the 995 Balu earthquake. Chapaghjur is sometimes identified with the Roman fortress-town of Citharizum (Ktʻaṛich in Armenian).
In the Middle Ages, Bingöl was known as Romanoupolis after the Byzantine emperor Romanos I Lekapenos, who incorporated it into the Byzantine Empire in 942. It initially formed a subdivision of the thema of Mesopotamia, but it was later (ca. 970) elevated into a separate theme.

Bingöl was ruled by the Suwaydid dynasty, a cadet branch of the Barmakids, from the 13th century until mid-Ottoman rule, autonomously from the Ottomans. Bingöl and the surrounding district had a large Armenian population prior to the Armenian genocide. Until the middle of the 20th century, the city was known as Çapakçur/Çabakçur, derived from its Armenian name. The place was then renamed Bingöl, meaning "thousand lakes" in Turkish.

Kurdish-Turkish conflict 
Bingöl has been the site of several violent incidents of the Kurdish-Turkish conflict. On 23 October 2016, a car bombing targeting an armored police vehicle perpetrated by PKK militias killed 2 police officers and injured 19 others. On 8 June 2018, a group of PKK militias attacked a military station and killed 1 Turkish soldier while injuring 3 others.

Geography
Bingöl is a mountainous area with heights reaching 3000 m, Bingöl city is at about 1120 m above sea level. The Gayt River (Gayt Çayı), a right-bank tributary of the Eastern Euphrates (Murat River), runs through the city.

Earthquakes 
On 1 May 2003 the whole area suffered from a magnitude 6.4 earthquake, leaving 176 dead and 520 injured. On 14 June 2020, a relatively small earthquake occurred in the region, killing a village guard and injuring 21 others.

Population

Transport 
Bingöl Airport opened on 12 July 2013. It has a passenger capacity of 500'000 a year.

Education 
Bingöl University opened on 29 May 2007. The University continues its activities with 9 faculties, 6 vocational schools and 5 institutes.

Climate 
Bingöl has a continental climate (Köppen climate classification: Dsa, or Trewartha climate classification: Dca), with hot, dry summers and cold, snowy winters. The driest months are July and August and the wettest is February and December.

References

Cities in Turkey
Populated places in Bingöl District
Kurdish settlements in Bingöl Province